Mikkeli Music Festival is an international Music Festival in Mikkeli, Finland, which attracts musicians and audiences from across Europe.  Mariinsky Opera led by Valery Gergiev performs there regularly, and the festival is sometimes called Gergiev Festival. The festival is run by him 16 times since 1993. The main site of the Festival is the Mikaeli Hall.

References

Music festivals in Finland
Classical music festivals in Finland